William 'Bill' MacFarlane Mitchell (15 August 1929 – 6 November 2005) was an English first-class cricketer.

Life 
Mitchell was born at Lewisham in August 1929. He was educated at Dulwich College, before going up to Merton College, Oxford. While studying at Oxford, Mitchell played first-class cricket for Oxford University. He made his debut against Middlesex in 1951, taking what was to be his only career five wicket haul when he took 5 for 107. He made ten appearances in his debut season, including an appearance in The University Match against Cambridge University. He featured in a further ten matches in 1952, though struggled to take wickets with his leg break googly bowling. The emergence of younger spinners and the pressure of his examinations limited him to six appearances in 1953. His 26 first-class matches yielded him 36 wickets at an average of 55.50. As a middle order batsman, he scored 480 runs with a high score of 45.

Mitchell died on 6 November 2005 after collapsing while acting as an usher at the memorial service to Edward Heath at Westminster Abbey.

References

External links

1929 births
2005 deaths
People from Lewisham
People educated at Dulwich College
Alumni of Merton College, Oxford
English cricketers
Oxford University cricketers